Brunn & Company was an American coachbuilding business founded in 1908 by carriage designer Hermann A. Brunn (1874-1941) in Buffalo, New York. He was the father of Hermann C. (1908-1989) who initially worked for his father, then was employed by the Ford Motor Company after Brunn & Company closed in 1941. Hermann A. Brunn also had an uncle named Henry Brunn who founded a second coachwork company in Buffalo called Brunn Carriage Mfg Co. Much of their work was for Lincoln Motor Cars after being purchased by the Ford Motor Company in 1922.

References
History of Brunn & company

External links

Coachbuilders of the United States
Defunct motor vehicle manufacturers of the United States
Luxury motor vehicle manufacturers
American companies established in 1908
Manufacturing companies established in 1908
Manufacturing companies based in New York (state)